The Rivière aux Bluets Sud (in English: Blueberries South River) is a tributary of the rivière aux Bluets which flows on the east shore of Grand lac Saint François ; the latter constitutes the head lake of the Saint-François River.

The course of the "Rivière aux Bluets Sud" crosses the territory of the municipalities of Saint-Sébastien and Courcelles, in the Le Granit Regional County Municipality, in the administrative region of Estrie, on the South Shore of the St. Lawrence River, in Quebec, Canada.

Geography 

The main hydrographic slopes close to the "Rivière aux Bluets Sud" are:
 north side: rivière aux Bluets (Grand lac Saint François), Petite rivière Muskrat;
 east side: rivière aux Bluets (Grand lac Saint François);
 south side:Sauvage River (Felton River);
 west side:Grand lac Saint François.

From its source, the river flows over:
  north-east to the fourth rang road;
  north-west, up to Route du Domaine;
  north, up to a rural road;
  towards the north-west, in Courcelles, up to the confluence of the Castonguay stream (coming from the south);
  towards the north-west, collecting the water from the Champagne stream (coming from the south) and passing to the south-west of the village of Courcelles, until at its mouth.

The mouth of the "rivière aux Bleuts Sud" empties on the south shore of the rivière aux Bluets (Grand lac Saint François), which flows north-west to flow onto the east bank of the Grand lac Saint François.

Toponymy 

The toponym "Rivière aux Bluets Sud" was officially registered on December 5, 1968, at the Commission de toponymie du Québec.

See also 

 List of rivers of Quebec

References 

Le Granit Regional County Municipality
Rivers of Estrie